The Men's super-G competition at the FIS Alpine World Ski Championships 2021 was scheduled for 9 February. It was postponed and ran on 11 February 2021.

Results
The race started at 13:00 CET (UTC+1) under clear skies.

References

Men's super-G